Vigan longganisa, also known as the Ilocano longganisa, is a Filipino pork sausage originating from Vigan City, Ilocos Sur. It is a type of de recado longganisa. It is made with ground lean pork, ground pork fat, brown sugar, garlic, onions, bay leaves, soy sauce, vinegar, black pepper, and salt to taste in hog casings. Chili flakes may also be added. The sausages are celebrated in an annual "Longganisa Festival" in Vigan City.

See also
 List of sausages

References

Philippine sausages